The Locone is a river in the Apulia and Basilicata regions of southern Italy. The source of the river is near Spinazzola in the province of Barletta-Andria-Trani. From there, the river flows north and forms the border between the province of Barletta-Andria-Trani and the province of Potenza for a short distance. The river re-enters the province of Barletta-Andria-Trani and is joined by a left tributary flowing from the province of Potenza before entering the Ofanto south of Cerignola as a right tributary of the river.

See also
Lago Locone
Loconia

References

Rivers of the Province of Barletta-Andria-Trani
Rivers of the Province of Potenza
Rivers of Italy
Adriatic Italian coast basins